Edwin Hardin Sutherland (August 13, 1883 – October 11, 1950) was an American sociologist. He is considered one of the most influential criminologists of the 20th century. He was a sociologist of the symbolic interactionist school of thought and is best known for defining white-collar crime and differential association, a general theory of crime and delinquency. Sutherland earned his Ph.D. in sociology from the University of Chicago in 1913. In 1939 Edwin was the first who introduced White Collar Crime.

Career
Sutherland's historical importance rests upon his having introduced (in a 27 December 1939 speech to the American Sociological Association, titled The White Collar Criminal) the concept of white-collar crime, a concept which violated existing prejudices that aristocrats can do no wrong (which was famously expressed in the ancient legal view that a king could do no wrong).

After receiving his PhD from the University of Chicago, Sutherland was at William Jewell College, Missouri (1913–1919), the University of Kansas (the summer of 1918), University of Illinois (1919–1925), Sutherland spent a summer at Northwestern (June–August 1922) prior to arriving at the University of Minnesota in 1925.

Sutherland solidified his reputation as one of the country's leading criminologists at the University of Minnesota, where he worked from 1926 to 1929. During this period, he concentrated in sociology as a scientific enterprise whose goal was to understand and control social problems. For several months in 1929 Sutherland studied the British penal system while in England. Also, during 1929–1930 Sutherland worked as a researcher with the Bureau of Social Hygiene in New York City. In 1930, Sutherland accepted a position as a research professor at the University of Chicago. In 1935 he took a position at Indiana University, where he remained till his untimely death on October 11, 1950. He founded the Bloomington School of Criminology at Indiana University.

During his time at Indiana, he published four books, including Twenty Thousand Homeless Men (1936), The Professional Thief (1937), the third edition of Principles of Criminology (1939), and the censored first edition of White Collar Crime (1949), his masterpiece. It remained censored until the original text was published in 1983 by Yale University Press.

Sutherland was elected president of the American Sociological Society in 1939, and president of the Sociological Research Association in 1940. If he had not already become prominent within the sociological profession prior to his introduction of the concept of white-collar crime in 1939, one can only speculate whether the seminal concept would have been published, as America's largest corporations threatened to sue the publishers of White Collar Crime. (They were successful, and had all references to the names of litigating corporations removed from the text.) When Yale University Press issued the unexpurgated version in 1983, the introduction by Gilbert Geis noted that Sutherland's concept of white-collar crime "altered the study of crime throughout the world in fundamental ways".

Theory
He was the author of the leading text Criminology, published in 1924, first stating the principle of differential association in the third edition retitled Principles of Criminology (1939:4–8) that the development of habitual patterns of criminality arise from association with those who commit crime rather than with those who do not commit crime. The theory also had a structural element positing that conflict and social disorganisation are the underlying causes of crime because they  the patterns of people associated with. This latter element was dropped when the fourth edition was published in 1947. But he remained convinced that social class was a relevant factor, coining the phrase white-collar criminal in a speech to the American Sociological Association on December 27, 1939. In his 1949 monograph White-Collar Criminology he defined a white-collar crime "approximately as a crime committed by a person of respectability and high social status in the course of his occupation."

Works
Sutherland, Edwin H. (1924) Principles of Criminology, Chicago: University of Chicago Press.
Sutherland, Edwin H. (1936) With Locke, H.J. Twenty Thousand Homeless Men: a study of unemployed men in the Chicago shelters, Philadelphia: J.B. Lippincott

Sutherland, Edwin H. (1942) Development of the Theory, in Karl Schuessler (ed.) Edwin H. Sutherland on Analyzing Crime, pp. 13–29. Chicago: University of Chicago Press.
Sutherland, Edwin H. (1949) White Collar Crime, New York: Holt, Rinehart & Winston.
Sutherland, Edwin H. (1950) The Diffusion of Sexual Psychopath Laws. American Journal of Sociology, Issue 56: pp. 142–148

See also
 Organi-cultural Deviance

References

External links
Edwin Sutherland at the American Sociological Association

1893 births
1950 deaths
American criminologists
University of Chicago alumni
University of Chicago faculty
Presidents of the American Sociological Association
People from Buffalo County, Nebraska
People from Grand Island, Nebraska
Members of the Sociological Research Association